Dida is a dialect cluster of the Kru family spoken in Ivory Coast.

ISO divides Dida into three groups, Yocoboué (Yokubwe) Dida (101,600 speakers in 1993), Lakota Dida (93,800 speakers in 1993), and Gaɓogbo (Guébié/Gebye) which are only marginally mutually intelligible and best considered separate languages. Yocoboué consists of the Lozoua (Lozwa) and Divo dialects (7,100 and 94,500 speakers), and Lakota the Lakota (Lákota), Abou (Abu), and Vata dialects. The prestige dialect is the Lozoua speech of the town of Guitry.

Phonology
The Dida lects have consonant and vowel inventories typical of the Eastern Kru languages. However, tone varies significantly between dialects, or at least between their descriptions. The following phonology is that of Abu Dida, from Miller (2005), and of Yocoboué Dida, from Masson (1992).

Vowels

Abu 
Abu Dida has a ten-vowel system: nine vowels distinguished by "tenseness", likely either pharyngealization or supra-glottal phonation (contraction of the larynx) of the type described as retracted tongue root, plus an uncommon mid-central vowel .

There is no tense contrast with the low vowel.) The formants of the tense vowels show them to be lower than their non-tense counterparts: the formants of the highest tense vowels overlap the formants of the non-tense mid vowels, but there is visible tension in the lips and throat when these are enunciated carefully.

Abu Dida has a number of diphthongs, which have the same number of tonal distinctions as simple vowels. Examples are  "bottle" (from English),  "get stuck", and  "little bone".

Dida also has nasal vowels, but they are not common and it is not clear how many. Examples are  "nothing",  "chin",  "25 cents" (from English "pound"). In diphthongs, nasalization shows up primarily on the second element of the vowel.

Vowel length is not distinctive, apart from phonesthesia (as in  "nothing"), morphemic contractions, and shortened grammatical words, such as the modal  "will" (compare its likely lexical source  "get").

Yocoboué 
Yocoboué Dida has a nine vowel system: four vowels being standard, and five vowels being a retracted series, plus a realization.

The four regular vowels are /i e o u/, and the retracted vowels are /ɪ ɛ a ɔ ʊ/. /a/ may also be realized as [ʌ].

All vowels do have nasal realizations, but the nasalization of vowels is not phonemic.

Consonants
The consonants in Abu Dida are typical for Eastern Kru:

Syllables may be vowel only, consonant-vowel, or consonant--vowel.  is a lateral approximant  initially, a lateral flap  between vowels and after most consonants ( "country"), but a central tap after alveolars ( "blood"). After a nasal, it is itself nasalized, and sounds like a short n. There is a short epenthetic vowel between the initial consonant and the flap, which takes the quality of the syllabic vowel that follows ( "country"). Flap clusters occur with all consonants, even the approximants ( "top"), apart from the alveolar sonorants  and the marginal consonant , which is only attested in the syllable .

 is implosive in the sense that the airstream is powered by the glottis moving downward, but there is no rush of air into the mouth.  occurs in few words, but one of these,  "appear", occurs in numerous common idioms, so overall it's not an uncommon sound. They may also be followed by a flap, as in  "face".

When emphasized, zero-onset words may take an initial , and initial approximants  may become fricated , .  becomes palatalized  before high front vowels, or  when emphasized.

The following consonants are for Yocoboué Dida:

/l/ can be realized as  when after alveolar stops, and as  when after nasals.

Tones
Dida uses tone as a grammatical device. Morpho-tonology plays a greater role in verb and pronominal paradigms than it does in nouns, and perhaps because of this, Dida verbs utilize a simpler tone system than nouns do: Noun roots have four lexically contrastive tones, subject pronouns have three, and verb roots have just two word tones.

Speaker intuition hears six contour tones:  rising  and falling . (The falling tones only reach  register at the end of a prosodic unit; otherwise the low falling tone  is realized as a simple low tone.) However, some of these only occur in morphologically complex words, such as perfective verbs.

References

Further reading

Kru languages
Languages of Ivory Coast